The Relief of Lucknow is a 1912 American silent film about the Relief of Lucknow during the Indian Rebellion of 1857. Filmed in 1911 by the Edison Company at locations in the Imperial fortress colony of Bermuda, including the Prospect Camp Garrison Golf Links clubhouse (originally a private home built around 1700, and now a Bermuda National Trust property named "Palmetto House" due to the still-extant ornamental stand of palmettos visible in front of it in the film), "Walsingham House" (an historic home built in 1652 that is currently the location of the "Tom Moore's Tavern" restaurant), and the walled streets of St. George's town.

The director was J. Searle Dawley, who relocated to Bermuda with a crew in 1911 and 1912, and the production was based at "Villa Monticello", an estate near to Flatts Village. The film makers received considerable assistance from the Bermuda Garrison of the British Army, with the 2nd Battalion of The Queen's (Royal West Surrey) Regiment providing extras. The film was released in 1912. The Imperial fortress colony of Bermuda and its garrison was also used as the location for another Edison film, For Valour, in which two army officers vie for the affections of a Bermudian woman during the Second Boer War.

References 

Films about the Indian Rebellion of 1857
1912 films
Films set in Lucknow
Films set in the British Raj
American silent short films
Films shot in Bermuda
Films about the British Army
Films set in 1857
British Empire war films
Films set in India
Cultural depictions of Indian people
Films set in the Indian independence movement
Indian Army in films